Chase Niece (born October 28, 1998) is an American soccer player who currently plays for North Texas SC in the MLS Next Pro.

Playing career

Youth, college and amateur
Niece played high school soccer at Kirkwood High School, where he was a Top 150 recruit by TopDrawerSoccer.com. He also played four years of club soccer with the St. Louis Scott Gallagher academy, scoring six goals in over 80 appearances for the team.

In 2017, Niece attended the University of Tulsa to play college soccer, but redshirted his entire freshman season. He transferred to Saint Louis University in 2018, going on make 63 appearances for the Billikens, scoring six goals and tallying two assists. Niece was named to the A-10 All-Championship team in 2021.

During 2021, Niece also played in the USL League Two for St. Louis Scott Gallagher, making nine appearances.

MLS SuperDraft
On January 11, 2022, Niece was selected 66th overall in the 2022 MLS SuperDraft by FC Dallas.

North Texas SC
On February 17, 2022, Niece signed with North Texas SC, the MLS Next Pro side for Dallas. He made his debut on March 27, 2022, starting in a 3–1 win over Minnesota United FC 2.

References

External links

1998 births
American soccer players
Association football defenders
FC Dallas draft picks
Living people
MLS Next Pro players
North Texas SC players
Saint Louis Billikens men's soccer players
Soccer players from Missouri
Sportspeople from St. Louis
Tulsa Golden Hurricane men's soccer players
USL League Two players